The Ukraine national rugby league team represents Ukraine in rugby league football. The team made their international debut as part of the 2009 European Bowl. 

Ukraine was originally scheduled to play in the 2008 European Bowl, but withdrew at the last minute due to problems with the team's visas.

Results
Source: Rugby League Project

See also

Sports in Ukraine

References

External links

National rugby league teams
National sports teams of Ukraine
Rugby league in Ukraine